Paradise Valley is an unincorporated community in Paradise Township in Monroe County, Pennsylvania, United States. Paradise Valley is located at the intersection of Pennsylvania Route 191 and Pennsylvania Route 940.

References

Unincorporated communities in Monroe County, Pennsylvania
Unincorporated communities in Pennsylvania